Rodolfo Árias Martínez (June 6, 1931 – January 12, 2018) was a Cuban-born professional baseball pitcher whose career in Organized Baseball in North America extended for a dozen seasons (1953–1962; 1966–1967).

All of Árias' 34 MLB appearances in 1959 came as a relief pitcher. He won two games and saved two more—with no defeats—as the ChiSox won their first AL pennant in 40 years. He did not pitch after August 26, and although he was listed on the club's 1959 World Series roster,  he did not appear in the Fall Classic, in which the White Sox fell to the Los Angeles Dodgers in six games. In his one big-league campaign, Árias allowed 49 hits and 20 bases on balls in 44 innings pitched, with 28 strikeouts.

He was the father of Rudy Árias, a former minor league player and a longtime bullpen catcher in the major leagues for the Florida Marlins, New York Yankees and Baltimore Orioles. Rudy Sr. died January 12, 2018, in Miami at the age of 86.

References

External links

1931 births
2018 deaths
Amarillo Gold Sox players
Chicago White Sox players
Colorado Springs Sky Sox (WL) players
Columbus Jets players
Havana Sugar Kings players
Jersey City Jerseys players
Madisonville Miners players
Macon Peaches players
Major League Baseball players from Cuba
Cuban expatriate baseball players in the United States
Major League Baseball pitchers
Miami Marlins (IL) players
People from Villa Clara Province
Petroleros de Poza Rica players
San Diego Padres (minor league) players
Toronto Maple Leafs (International League) players
Waterloo White Hawks players
Cuban expatriate baseball players in Mexico